Ross Woods Anderson (born 24 October 1968) is a former butterfly and freestyle swimmer for New Zealand

He competed for New Zealand at the 1988 Summer Olympics in Seoul, South Korea. There he was eliminated in the qualifying heats of the 100 m freestyle, and 100 m and 200 m butterfly. He won the bronze medal with the Men's 4 × 200 m freestyle relay team at the 1990 Commonwealth Games. He was awarded the New Zealand 1990 Commemoration Medal.

See also
 List of Commonwealth Games medallists in swimming (men)

References

External links
 Profile on NZ Olympic Committee

1968 births
Living people
Olympic swimmers of New Zealand
Swimmers at the 1988 Summer Olympics
New Zealand male freestyle swimmers
New Zealand male butterfly swimmers
People from Madang Province
Commonwealth Games bronze medallists for New Zealand
Swimmers at the 1990 Commonwealth Games
Commonwealth Games medallists in swimming
Medallists at the 1990 Commonwealth Games
20th-century New Zealand people